Trinity United Methodist Church is a historic Methodist church in Athens, McMinn County, Tennessee.

The congregation was founded in 1824-5 as the Methodist Episcopal Church of Athens. Its first meeting house was a structure of hewn logs built by slaves. It stood at the southwest corner of West Washington and Church Streets in Athens. It was eventually replaced by a brick building. When the Civil War resulted in a split within the Methodist Episcopal denomination, the congregation affiliated with the Methodist Episcopal Church, South. After the 1939 merger between that denomination and the Methodist Episcopal Church and the Methodist Protestant Church, the church became known as Trinity Methodist Church. It became a United Methodist church in 1968, when the Methodist Church and the Evangelical United Brethren Church combined to form that denomination.

The present church building was completed in 1910 at a cost of $32,449.28; its education wing was added in 1926. The Gothic Revival architectural design of the 1910 church was provided by Badgley and Nicklas, a Cleveland, Ohio, architecture firm. The building design features two towers, stained glass windows with stone tracery, an octagonal dome ceiling, and eight columns to represent the eight people who survived Noah's flood. It has an Akron floor plan, which allows the sanctuary to be expanded to accommodate large events.

In 2009, the church building was listed on the National Register of Historic Places.

References

External links
 

Churches on the National Register of Historic Places in Tennessee
Gothic Revival church buildings in Tennessee
Churches completed in 1910
Churches in McMinn County, Tennessee
United Methodist churches in Tennessee
Southern Methodist churches in the United States
National Register of Historic Places in McMinn County, Tennessee